Colegio de San Lorenzo (CDSL) was a private Catholic college located in Barangay Bahay Toro, Quezon City and in Macabebe, Pampanga. It opened in 1988 in Quezon City and the branch in the founder's hometown of Macabebe opened in 1996.

On August 15, 2022, Colegio de San Lorenzo announced it would be closing down and would cease operations by September 2022, citing financial instability and lack of financial viability due to the COVID-19 pandemic. The sudden announcement of its shutdown, on what would have been the school's first day of classes, brought negative responses from parents, students, and employees alike.

Gritty Griffins
SanLo varsity team, the Gritty Griffins, is a member of the Universities, Colleges, and Schools Athletic Association (UCSAA) and the Universities and Colleges of Luzon Athletic Association (UCLAA). The Senior Basketball team won the UCSAA championship in four consecutive years, 2012 to 2015.

Publications
Escribano – The Ruizian Record (official school paper)
Escribano Online
Interaction: A Multidisciplinary Research Journal

References

External links
Colegio de San Lorenzo official website
Colegio De San Lorenzo on Wikimapia

Universities and colleges in Quezon City
Universities and colleges in Pampanga
1987 establishments in the Philippines
2022 disestablishments in the Philippines